Coleophora anguliferella is a moth of the family Coleophoridae that is endemic to Libya.

References

External links

anguliferella
Moths of Africa
Endemic fauna of Libya
Moths described in 1934